Winston is an American brand of cigarettes, currently owned and manufactured by ITG Brands, subsidiary of Imperial Tobacco in the United States and by Japan Tobacco outside the U.S. The brand is named after the town where R. J. Reynolds started his business which is Winston-Salem, North Carolina. , Winston has the seventh-highest U.S. market share (2 percent) of all cigarette brands, according to the Centers for Disease Control and Prevention and the Maxwell Report.

This market share has been falling since 2003, when it peaked at 3.92 percent, although Winston has consistently been in the top 10 cigarette brands by U.S. market share since 2001, according to data from the Substance Abuse and Mental Health Services Administration's National Household Survey on Drug Abuse.

History
Winston was introduced in 1954 by the R.J. Reynolds Tobacco Company and quickly became one of the top-selling cigarette brands, using the slogan "Winston tastes good like a cigarette should". It became the number one cigarette sold in the world by 1966, a position it held until 1972 when Marlboro overtook the brand.

In the 1980s, Winston was the most favored brand in Puerto Rico, thanks to their advertising slogan "Winston y Puerto Rico: No hay nada mejor" (Winston and Puerto Rico: There is nothing better).

Winston then became the #2 cigarette, a position it continues to maintain today under ownership of Japan Tobacco outside of the U.S. while the American version of the brand has faced steadily declining sales, dropping to sixth place by 2005 in the last national survey. The American version of Winston is also known for its more recent claim of becoming additive-free in the late 1990s. This in turn led to a settlement with the Federal Trade Commission requiring Winston to clarify subsequent advertisements that the lack of additives did not result in a safer cigarette.

In 1999, R.J. Reynolds was spun off from RJR Nabisco and subsequently sold its non-U.S. operations to Japan Tobacco.

On July 15, 2014, Reynolds American (R.J. Reynolds parent company) agreed to purchase the Lorillard Tobacco Company for $27.4 billion and as a result, (to alleviate antitrust concerns) Winston, along with the Kool, Maverick, and Salem cigarette brands, was sold to Imperial Tobacco for $7.1 billion.

On June 12, 2015, Reynolds American and Lorillard completed their merger and Winston officially fell under ownership of Imperial tobacco spinoff ITG brands.

Sponsorship

NASCAR
Beginning in 1971, Winston was the sponsor of the highest title of the NASCAR series, known as the Winston Cup Series. R. J. Reynolds ended Winston's association with the series in 2003. The series is now known as the NASCAR Cup Series.

Drag Racing
From 1975 to 2001, Winston was also the sponsor of the NHRA drag racing series, which is currently sponsored by Camping World.

Superbike World Championship
Winston sponsored the Ten Kate Racing team in 2005 and 2006. In countries where tobacco advertising was prohibited, the acronym "WinWin" was used instead.

Football/Soccer
Winston was a sponsor of the 1982 FIFA World Cup.

Formula 1

In 1998 and 1999 they were lanced as the main donator for the Williams F1-Team.

Controversy

Winston and The Flintstones
In 1960, Winston was one of the original sponsors of The Flintstones up until 1962. In the commercials, Flintstones characters Fred Flintstone and Barney Rubble were seen promoting Winston, and every episode ended with Fred lighting a Winston for his wife Wilma while singing the product's jingle. By the third season, however, the show's ads became more oriented towards children and Winston was replaced by Welch's.

Winston and targeting of African Americans
In the 1970s, Winston specifically targeted the Afro-American minority, similar to what Kool and Newport did during the time.

After World War II had ended, American tobacco companies started to explore new markets to maintain their prosperity. The growth in urban migration and the growing incomes of African Americans (called at the time the "emerging Negro market") gave the tobacco companies what was sometimes called an "export market at home". Additionally, a new kind of media started to appear after the war when several glossy monthly magazines including Negro Digest (1942, renamed Black World), Ebony (1945) and Negro Achievements (1947, renamed Sepia) began to be published. These relatively expensively produced magazines were far more attractive to the tobacco advertisers than the cheap "Negro" daily newspapers of the pre-war era, with glossy pages and a far wider national distribution. The magazines meant for a purely African-American audience also meant that advertisers could produce adverts aimed at and featuring African Americans away from the eyes of white consumers.

David Goerlitz and the Winston Man
Between 1982 and 1988, David Goerlitz was the "Winston Man", appearing in 42 billboard advertisements – more than the Marlboro man. In 1988, he publicly denounced the tobacco industry and joined the emerging anti-smoking movement after suffering health issues related to smoking. He has spent more than 20 years working in schools as a public speaker, encouraging kids not to start smoking.

Winston and additive-free claims
In September 2015, the US Food and Drug Administration (FDA) warned ITG Brands, the makers of Winston cigarettes, that labeling the product as "additive-free" violated federal law because the claim implied that the cigarettes were safer than other brands.

The August warning letter to ITG marked the first time the FDA had used its authority under a 2009 tobacco-control law to take action against a company for making "additive-free" ("No Bull" ad campaign) claims on product packaging. It was one of three warning letters that the agency shipped out in August 2015 to cigarette companies whose products were labeled "additive-free", "natural" or both.

Markets

Winston cigarettes were or still are sold in the following countries: Iran, Canada, United States, Mexico, Chile, Peru, Argentina, Brazil, United Kingdom, Sweden, Finland, Luxembourg, Belgium, the Netherlands, Germany, France, Switzerland, Austria, Portugal, Spain, Italy, Poland, Hungary, Iceland, Romania, Moldova, Croatia, Czech Republic, Slovakia, Slovenia, Serbia, Albania, Greece, Turkey, Armenia, Azerbaijan, Georgia, Estonia, Lithuania, Latvia, Belarus, Ukraine, Russia, Kazakhstan, Kyrgyzstan, Uzbekistan, Tunesia, South Africa, Israel, Lebanon, Jordan, Kuwait, Kosovo, Morocco, Myanmar, Vietnam, Egypt, Indonesia, Malaysia, Nepal, Norway, Cyprus, Singapore, Hong Kong, Japan, Taiwan, North Macedonia, the Philippines, Timor Leste, and Ethiopia.

Varieties

Varieties sold in the United States
As of 2017, all varieties of Winston sold by ITG brands are only available in a box.

Winston Red (Full Flavor) – Kings, 100s
Winston Gold (Lights) – Kings, 100s
Winston White (Ultra Lights) – Kings, 100s
Winston Black (Bold) - Kings, 100s
Winston Select – Kings

In 2020 Winston Green (Menthol) - Kings, 100s was introduced

In 2022, all of the Winston box cigarettes were redesigned to a new style that says "Winston: Tobacco & Water".

See also

 Tobacco smoking

References

External links

 

Imperial Brands brands
Products introduced in 1954